The Sierra-class corvettes are corvettes of the Mexican Navy intended mainly for interception of drug smugglers, exclusive economic zone (EEZ) patrol, and countering terrorism. The class comprises four ships with the lead ship ARM Sierra commissioned by the Mexican Navy in 1998. One ship, ARM Benito Juárez, was sunk as a target ship in 2007 after being wrecked by fire in 2003. The other three vessels remain in service.

Design and development
Originally, this project was designated Holzinger 2000 because it is a further development of the  ships introduced in the early 1990s. The Sierra class has a different superstructure than the preceding Holzinger class. The corvettes are powered by two Caterpillar 3616 V16 diesel engines turning two shafts creating  total. The vessels have  two  and one  generators for power production. 

The Sierra class mount a Saab EOS 450 optronic director for fire control, and radars operating on the E/F and I-bands for navigation, surface and air search. They are equipped with the Alenia 2 combat data system. These ships have an aft flight deck and hangar for one MBB Bo 105C helicopter. The corvettes are armed with one  Mk3 naval gun on the fore deck to engage air and surface targets. The corvettes have a complement of 75 including 10 officers.

Construction and career
Four vessels were ordered by the Mexican Navy in 1997 from shipyards in Tampico and Salina Cruz. The lead ship Justo Sierra Mendez (shortened to Sierra by the Mexican Navy) was commissioned on 1 June 1999 and the last, Guillermo Prieto (shortened to Prieto) on 17 September 1999.

On 24 October 2003 a fire broke out aboard Juárez while operating in the Gulf of Mexico. The fire quickly engulfed the ship, leading to the crew abandoning ship. The fire was brought under control with the aid of the Petróleos Mexicanos (PEMEX) tugboat Avila Karisma and the Mexican Navy vessels ARM Sierra,  and  while the crew were evacuated to Mexican naval facilities in Ciudad del Carmén, Campeche. To allow for the corvette to be towed, the heat on the deck had to be reduced. Instructed by a PEMEX specialist firefighter, the vessels coordinated their efforts and brought the temperature down enough for the PEMEX tugboat Adee Tide II to begin towing operations on 25 October and brought the vessel to Dos Bocas, Tabasco. Juárez was decommissioned and used as a target ship in July 2007.

Ships in class

Notes

Citations

References

Further reading
 Wertheim, E. (2007) Naval Institute Guide to Combat Fleets of the World: Their Ships, Aircraft, and Systems. 15 edition. US Naval Institute Press.

Ships of the Mexican Navy
Corvette classes
Ships built in Mexico